Ángel Rafael Torres Ruiz (born October 24, 1952), is a former Major League Baseball pitcher who played in  with the Cincinnati Reds. He batted and threw left-handed. Torres had a 0-0 record, with a 2.16 ERA, in five games, in his one-year career. He was signed by the St. Louis Cardinals in 1971 as an amateur free agent. He was traded along with Bill Greif and Sam Mejías from the Cardinals to the Montreal Expos for Tony Scott, Steve Dunning and Pat Scanlon on November 8, 1976.  He was then dealt to the Reds early in the 1977 season.

References

External links

1952 births
Living people
Cincinnati Reds players
Dominican Republic expatriate baseball players in the United States

Major League Baseball pitchers
Major League Baseball players from the Dominican Republic
Santo Domingo Azucareros players
St. Petersburg Cardinals players